The 1964 NSWRFL season was the fifty-seventh season of Sydney's professional rugby league football competition, the New South Wales Rugby Football League Premiership, Australia's first. Ten clubs from across the city competed for the J. J. Giltinan Shield and the WD & HO Wills Cup during the season, which culminated in a grand final between St. George and Balmain.

Teams

Ladder

Finals

Grand Final

St. George captain-coach Norm Provan was matching up against his younger brother (and former Dragon) Peter, who had moved to the Tigers in 1961.

The Tigers’ defence was strong throughout a dour first half and for the first time in nine grand finals the Dragons trailed at half-time (4–2) with Balmain in the lead after penalty goals from Keith "Golden Boots" Barnes.

The turning point of the match came five minutes into the second half. The Tigers were defending their own line with some desperate tackling when they received a relieving penalty from referee Pearce. Balmain's Bob Boland put in a big punt which at first looked like a good touch finder. To Balmain's horror, Graeme Langlands stretched and then caught the ball with his boots only an inch or two from the touchline. The champion fullback then raced cross-field towards the Balmain line and sent a cut-out pass to Billy Smith 25 yards out from the tryline. The centre made further inroads before channeling a pass to Johnny King who sped down the left wing for 20 yards to score a diving try.

Test winger Johnny King thus kept intact his grand final record with this being his fifth successive try in a decider.

Eighteen-year-old Dennis Tutty stood out for the Tigers, providing reliable cover defence that stopped the Dragons on numerous occasions. For St. George, Smith and Langlands had strong games with Langlands tallying 72 points in his last four games of the season. Brian Clay had by now reclaimed his five-eighth position from Bruce Pollard and excelled just as he had in his five previous Grand Final appearances.

St. George 11 (Tries: King. Goals: Langlands 4.)

Balmain 6 (Goals: Barnes 3.)

Player statistics
The following statistics are as of the conclusion of Round 18.

Top 5 point scorers

Top 5 try scorers

Top 5 goal scorers

References

External links
 Season 1964 Rugby League Tables
 Writer, Larry (1995) Never Before, Never Again, Pan MacMillan, Sydney
Results: 1961-70 at rabbitohs.com
1964 J J Giltinan Shield and WD & HO Wills Cup at rleague.com
NSWRFL season 1964 at rugbyleagueproject.com
St. George 1964 season at showroom.com.au

NSW
New South Wales Rugby League premiership